Francesco Nori (1565 – 30 December 1631) was a Roman Catholic prelate who served as Bishop of San Miniato (1624–1631).

Biography
Francesco Nori was born in Florence, Italy in 1565 and ordained a priest in 1603.
On 11 March 1624, he was appointed during the papacy of Pope Urban VIII as Bishop of San Miniato.
On 27 May 1624, he was consecrated bishop by Ottavio Bandini, Cardinal-Bishop of Palestrina, with Alessandro del Caccia, Bishop of Pistoia, and Tommaso Ximenes, Bishop of Fiesole, serving as co-consecrators. 
He served as Bishop of San Miniato until his death on 30 December 1631.

References

External links and additional sources
 (for Chronology of Bishops) 
 (for Chronology of Bishops)  

17th-century Italian Roman Catholic bishops
Bishops appointed by Pope Urban VIII
1565 births
1631 deaths